The Dominican Summer League Twins or DSL Twins are a Rookie League affiliate of the Minnesota Twins based in the Dominican Republic. They play in the Dominican Summer League. As an independent affiliate, they have been in existence since 2001.

History
The team first came into existence in 1998. For the 1998 and 1999 seasons, they had a cooperative affiliation and were known as the DSL Twins/Co-op.  In 2000, they shared an affiliation with the Cleveland Indians and were called the DSL Twins/Indians.  They have been independently affiliated with the Twins since 2001.

Roster

References

Baseball teams established in 2001
Minnesota Twins minor league affiliates
Dominican Summer League teams
Baseball teams in the Dominican Republic
2001 establishments in the Dominican Republic